The Moho River is a river of Guatemala and Belize. The river is navigable year round between Santa Teresa and the mouth.

See also
List of rivers of Guatemala
List of rivers of Belize

References

Rivers of Guatemala
Rivers of Belize
Toledo District
International rivers of North America